Three Hearts for Julia is a 1943 American romantic comedy film directed by Richard Thorpe and starring Ann Sothern and Melvyn Douglas. The film was distributed by Metro-Goldwyn-Mayer.

Plot
Foreign correspondent Jeff Seabrook's prolonged absences are frustrating his musician wife Julia so much, she is planning a divorce. Jeff hasn't told her he is on his way home. Julia hasn't told him she is leaving him, with orchestra manager David Torrance and music critic Philip Barrows both already wooing her.

Jeff's newspaper editor John Girard advises him to act as if he accepts her decision. Julia tries to concentrate on her music, playing in an all-female band (due to the war), which new conductor Anton Ottaway resents, feeling the music is too low-brow.

Although temporarily off-duty from his job, Jeff is suddenly called up for active military duty. He takes Julia against her will to a remote cabin, forcing her to think about her decision to get a divorce, angering her suitors, who believe she's gone off with her husband deliberately. Jeff doesn't tell Julia he's going off to do his duty for Uncle Sam, but she takes him back anyway.

Cast
 Ann Sothern as Julia Seabrook
 Melvyn Douglas as Jeff Seabrook
 Lee Bowman as David Torrance
 Richard Ainley as Philip Barrows
 Felix Bressart as Anton Ottoway
 Marta Linden as May Elton
 Reginald Owen as John Girard
 Marietta Canty as Mattie

External links

 
 
 

1943 films
1943 romantic comedy films
American romantic comedy films
American black-and-white films
1940s English-language films
Films directed by Richard Thorpe
Films scored by Herbert Stothart
Films set on the home front during World War II
Metro-Goldwyn-Mayer films
1940s American films